Elena Tkachenko (born July 31, 1983 in Sevastopol, Ukraine) is an Individual Rhythmic Gymnast who competed for Belarus.

Career 
Tkachenko started doing gymnastics in Sevastopol at age 8 years old, which is by some standards is considered late for rhythmic gymnastics development. At 10 years old, she and her family moved to Simferopol where she met her first coach Liubov Serebrianskaya.

When she turned 16, she got an opportunity to move to Belarus through the idea appeared after the conversations between Liubov Serebrianskaya and Belarus Head coach Irina Leparskaya. Tkachenko has said "I couldn't show my talent on my homeland. On National competitions I took 13-15 places and when I went to international competitions, I was often higher than other Ukrainian girls. So when I was asked if I want to move to Minsk, I said with no doubts : "Yes!".

Tkachenko's move to Belarus changed her rankings dramatically within a year she became No.3 gymnast in Belarus and No.2 after the retirement of Lera Vatkina. She began competing in more international competitions and with the year 2001 becoming her most successful season winning silver in clubs at the 2001 World Championships in Madrid and 4 bronze medals at the 2001 World Games in Akita, Japan. Tkachenko completed her career in 2002 season.

References

External links
 Rhythmic Gymnastics Results
 

1983 births
Living people
Belarusian rhythmic gymnasts
Medalists at the Rhythmic Gymnastics World Championships
Medalists at the Rhythmic Gymnastics European Championships
World Games bronze medalists
Competitors at the 2001 World Games
21st-century Belarusian women